is Godiego's second live album. It is a recording of Godiego's concert in Tianjin, China. The concert was the first rock concert performed in China, and it was broadcast simultaneously in China and Japan on January 1, 1981. The album cover was specially designed with yellow text on a red background, with all credits and song titles written in simplified Chinese. Most of the songs were performed in English, with some songs partially in Japanese and others partially in Mandarin.

Track listing

References

1980 live albums
Godiego albums
Japanese-language albums